Samuel Chaffey was born in England and immigrated to Upper Canada in 1816 with his brother Benjamin.

Samuel and Benjamin's move to Canada was a result of the economic slump in England following the Napoleonic War. Their history is tied to a variety of business ventures primarily in milling with water power. The business endeavours of Samuel, in particular, had varied results.

Samuel is remembered in Canadian history because of the expropriation of his last mills. They were dismantled to construct a lock on the new Rideau Canal. The lock-station was named for Samuel Chaffey and the present-day community of Chaffeys Locks soon developed at that site.

References 

 

Canadian businesspeople